Kanumuri Bapi Raju (born 25 June 1947) is an Indian politician, a five term Member of Legislative Assembly in the Andhra Pradesh Legislative Assembly and a two term Member of Parliament. Raju represented the Narsapuram constituency in 1998 and 2009. He also served as the Chairman of the Tirumala Tirupathi Devasthanam.

See also 
 Politics of Andhra Pradesh

External links
 Indian governmental profile

References 

Living people
1947 births
Indian National Congress politicians from Andhra Pradesh
India MPs 1998–1999
India MPs 2009–2014
Lok Sabha members from Andhra Pradesh
United Progressive Alliance candidates in the 2014 Indian general election
Members of the Andhra Pradesh Legislative Council
People from West Godavari district
Telugu politicians